Lebia analis is a species of beetle in the family of Carabidae, Harpalinae subfamily.

Description
Adult beetles are 1/3 of an inch long, in some cases: . The elytron have pale apical marking which is interrupted by a fine black border along the suture. The pronotum in upper lateral region is striated. The color of it is brown and black. Sometimes they come in orangy-dark purple color.

Distribution
The species is native to Canada.

Ecology
The beetle eats foliage and flowers of various plants.

References

Lebia
Endemic fauna of Canada
Beetles described in 1825
Beetles of North America